The Murmansk College of Arts located in Murmansk, Russia, trains professional musicians in the region. The college was founded in 1958. The institute specializes in the field of culture and art of the Kola Peninsula.

Courses offered 

 Instrument performance with specializations in Piano, Orchestra String Instruments and Folk Orchestra Instruments
Choral Conducting
 Variety Music Art with specializations in Variety Show Instruments and Variety Singing
Music Theory
 Acting with a specialization in Drama Theatre and Film Actor

References 

Music schools in Russia
Universities and colleges in Russia
1958 establishments in Russia
Educational institutions established in 1958
Murmansk